21 Guns or Twenty-One Guns may refer to:

21-gun salute, an arms salute as a military honor
21 Guns (band), a 1990s rock band formed by Thin Lizzy guitarist Scott Gorham
"21 Guns" (song), a song from Green Day's 2009 album 21st Century Breakdown
"Twenty-One Guns" (ER), a 2006 episode from the 12th season of the medical drama ER
"Twenty-One Guns", a song on the 1996 split EP Ignite / Good Riddance